Elia George Kaiyamo (born 10 January 1951) is a Namibian politician. A member of SWAPO, Kaiyamo was an internal organizer and teacher for SWAPO prior to independence. He served in the Cabinet of Namibia as Deputy Minister of Home Affairs and Immigration from 2010 to 2015. On 2 September 2016, President Hage Geingob appointed Kaiyamo as Ambassador-designate to the People's Republic of China.

Early life and education
Born at Ondobe in Ohangwena Region, Kaiyamo earned a B.A. from the University of Cape Town in 1989. He earned another B.A. from the University of Namibia in 1992. In 1994, Kaiyamo earned a M.A. in international relations from Pacific Western University in Los Angeles, California in the United States.

Career
Kaiyamo worked at various schools in Katutura, the blacks-only township of Windhoek from 1976 to 1987. He was also an organizer for SWAPO during this time period. In 1988–1989, Kaiyamo studied in Cape Town towards a bachelor's degree. Kaiyamo returned as Namibia became independent and became assistant principal at A Shipena High School in Windhoek. Lasting in that position until 1991, he left education to work for the Foreign Ministry of Namibia. Kaiyamo worked in Europe at various Namibian embassies, including in Russia, Germany and Austria from 1991 to 1997. From 1997 to 1999, Kaiyamo served as desk officer at the Foreign Ministry. He was selected to represent SWAPO in the National Assembly in 2000 and subsequently re-elected in 2005 and 2009. Kaiyamo was appointed Deputy Minister of Home Affairs and Immigration in President Hifikepunye Pohamba's new cabinet on 21 March 2010.

Publications 
Research proposals on Namibia 2010; Education and Stakeholders in Namibia 2007

Awards 
Room of Fame, Namibia, 2007

References

1951 births
Living people
People from Ohangwena Region
Members of the National Assembly (Namibia)
Namibian educators
University of Namibia alumni
University of Cape Town alumni
Namibian expatriates in the United States
Namibian expatriates in South Africa
SWAPO politicians
Government ministers of Namibia
Ambassadors of Namibia to China